Single system may refer to:

 Single-system image, a concept in cluster computing
 Single-system interpretation, a concept in Marxist theory
 Single-system recording, a concept in film production